The 2015 Amgen Tour of California was the tenth edition of the Tour of California cycling stage race. It was held from May 10–17, and rated as a 2.HC event on the UCI America Tour. It began in Sacramento and finished in Pasadena.

The race's general classification was won by Slovakian Peter Sagan by three seconds over Frenchman Julian Alaphilippe, the closest winning margin in the race's history. Sagan also won two stages during the race, including the individual time trial. Colombian Sergio Henao completed the podium. The sprints competition was won by Briton Mark Cavendish, who also was the winner of four individual stages. Latvian Toms Skujiņš of domestic team  also won a stage and wore the leader's jersey for three stages.

Schedule

Teams
Eighteen teams were selected to take part in the race. As a 2.HC event, the race organizers could invite UCI ProTeams to make up 70% of the line-up; however, only eight ProTeams were invited, along with four UCI Professional Continental teams and six UCI Continental teams. The maximum number of riders allowed per team was eight, so the field had a maximum of 144 cyclists.

Preview and race favorites

As in 2014, the race followed a North to South route through California, visiting thirteen host cities. The overall classification was to be determined late in the race, notably in the time trial at Santa Clarita on Stage 6 and on the subsequent stage to Mount Baldy. The crosswinds often had an effect on the flatter stages and formed echelons of riders on the road. Former multiple Tour of California stage winner Jens Voigt was a race ambassador, served as a television analyst and was an adviser to the organizers. Anti-doping tests were conducted in-and-out of the competition by the United States Anti-Doping Agency (USADA), in agreement with the Union Cycliste Internationale (UCI). USADA's tests included researching for testosterone, CERA and human growth hormone (HGH). Subsequently, no positive tests were declared at the race nor after it.

The winner of the 2014 edition, Bradley Wiggins, did not participate in 2015 as he was going back to track cycling. Outsiders included Jacques Janse van Rensburg, Janez Brajkovič – a former Tour de France top-10 finisher – as well as Matthew Busche, Rob Britton and Phil Gaimon.

Ben Jacques-Maynes, who had competed in all previous editions of the race, was also on the startlist but he had to abandon after Stage 2 because of a crash.

Stages

Stage 1
May 10, 2015 — Sacramento to Sacramento, 

The first stage of the race was generally pan flat and included three intermediate sprints in Walnut Grove, Isleton and West Sacramento, and a section of dirt roads starting  into the race and lasting .

Soon,  took the reins of the bunch, controlling for their sprinter Mark Cavendish. Clarke grabbed the first points on offer for the sprints classification in Walnut Grove, and also won the second intermediate sprint, accumulating six bonus seconds towards the general classification.

At the front, the four riders in the break were forming a mini-echelon to shelter themselves from the winds, when Britton suffered a mechanical and decided to sit up and wait for the peloton. With  to race, ' Johnathan Freter crashed on the left side of the road, but was also able to return to the peloton.

Stage 2
May 11, 2015 — Nevada City to Lodi, 

The second stage of the race again contained three intermediate sprints which were included in the first half of the parcours. There was also one categorized climb which summited after  of racing, a category 4 climb situated on State Route 49 to determine the first leader of the mountains classification. There was a finishing circuit in Lodi, which the riders completed twice.

A flurry of attacks occurred from kilometer zero, and after numerous failed attempts, Daniel Oss and Markel Irizar succeeded in getting from the peloton. Carpenter took the first sprint points in Meadow Vista, and also led over the categorized climb, to take the polka-dot jersey for the third stage.  later, an intermediate sprint was contested in Cool, and was also won by Carpenter, who completed a sweep of the sprints in El Dorado. The breakaway enjoyed a maximum advantage of just over five minutes in the flat, open terrain, with  controlling the pace for race leader Mark Cavendish.

With  to go, the breakaway quartet held a 2' 40" lead over the peloton, but this gap decreased on the run-in to Lodi. The breakaway was absorbed shortly afterwards and no one tried to escape the bunch from that point on. In a very fast finish, Wouter Wippert launched a long sprint and Sagan jumped onto his wheel. Cavendish opened his own sprint on the right side of the road and Sagan popped out of Wippert's wheel on the left, with Cavendish prevailing to take his second stage in a row, with Wippert rounding-up the podium.

Stage 3
May 12, 2015 — San Jose to San Jose, 

The third stage of the race featured only one intermediate sprint, contested in Livermore, then the climbing began. One of the category 4 climbs was situated at the end of the stage in San Jose, where the finale featured  at an average gradient of 10%.

The start of the stage was very fast since a lot of riders wanted a chance to get the mountain points on offer during the stage. After  of racing and numerous attempts at forming a breakaway, riders were being dropped due to the rapid pace. Travis Meyer was first through the intermediate sprint as the composition of the leading group was still changing by the minute. Soon, Roy Curvers, Daniel Oss, Jonathan Clarke, Evan Huffman, Oscar Clark and Toms Skujiņš (both of ) joined Meyer and formed the break.

Oss swept the three fourth-category climbs prior to Mount Hamilton, as the gap to the escapees was hovering around three-and-a-quarter minutes. At the foot of the climb, Skujiņš accelerated away from his companions and took maximum points, while behind him, the peloton split into several groups as they tackled the climb. Following the descent, Peter Sagan suffered a mechanical incident, but was able to rejoin the peloton. Skujiņš won the second-category climb at Quimby, but crashed on the descent as he made contact with a protective hay stack. Skujiņš remained clear to the end of the stage, completing a  solo victory to take the lead of both the general and mountains classifications. Sagan, Julian Alaphilippe and Daniel Jaramillo were 1' 06" back, with a further 20 riders coming across the line 3 seconds later.

Stage 4
May 13, 2015 — Pismo Beach to Avila Beach, 

The fourth stage featured three intermediate sprints once again, contested in Guadalupe, Orcutt and Arroyo Grande respectively. Between the final two sprints, the peloton had to ascend a  third-category climb on Tepusquet Road.

Despite the stiff crosswinds, the peloton rode at speeds approaching  early on. The first sprint was won by Gregory Daniel while the race was still in "breakaway formation mode". Daniel was one of five riders that would eventually be part of the day's breakaway, along with Jesse Anthony, Kiel Reijnen, Daniel Teklehaimanot and Will Clarke – who had featured in the break on stage one. The  ascent of Tepusquet Road averaged 5% until the final kilometer, which was steeper at nearly 7%. The gap to the leaders reduced on the climb, with Anthony taking maximum points at the front.

After descending from the climb, the riders had to deal with a change of wind direction on the flatter roads, and  unsuccessfully tried to create echelons. With  left, the peloton was spread across the road, trying to sort out their lead-out trains ahead of a technical finish, with three 90-degree corners in the last kilometer and a short, steep rise right before the line. Daniel Oss tried his luck under the red kite, but was joined with about  remaining as Sagan powered his way past him to claim his second victory of the season, followed by Wouter Wippert and Mark Cavendish. With a 10-second bonus for his victory, Sagan reduced Skujiņš' overall classification lead to 22 seconds.

Stage 5
May 14, 2015 — Santa Barbara to Santa Clarita, 

The stage had two intermediate sprint contests held in Ojai and Santa Paula. Four categorized climbs were on the itinerary, two of them (both fourth-category) being situated on State Route 150, along with the third-category Dennison Grade and the fourth-category Balcom Canyon.

From the start, Daniel Oss tried to get clear from the peloton since he was in second place in the Mountains competition, one point behind Toms Skujiņš, who led this classification as well as the general classification. Oss was unsuccessful in his attempt, but his teammate Danilo Wyss also tried to get clear, despite being only 47 seconds down on the general classification. The responsibility for the chase fell upon 's riders, whose task it was to manage the gap. The break soon hit the first two short, steep categorized climbs near Lake Casitas, with Wyss leading the quintet over on both occasions.

Immediately after that, the riders ascended the Dennison Grade climb, won by Morton. The leaders passed Santa Paula where Wyss won the last intermediate sprint of the day. The very steep climb of Balcom Canyon was won by Morton, while behind Chris Butler of  attacked from the main field and tried to bridge to the escapees.

He was finally caught with  remaining. A bunch sprint ensued on drier roads in Santa Clarita, with Mark Cavendish taking his third stage victory, beating Zico Waeytens by a bike length. With third place, Peter Sagan reduced Skujiņš' overall lead for a second consecutive day, with the lead standing at 18 seconds.

Stage 6
May 15, 2015 — Santa Clarita to Santa Clarita, individual time trial (ITT)

The course was mainly flat and did not feature many corners, but there was a 180 degree turnaround. Race director Jim Birrell stated that "the result is really anyone's guess" ahead of the stage.

As was customary of time trial stages, cyclists set off in reverse order from where they were ranked in the general classification at the end of the previous stage. Riders went on the course at one-minute intervals until the last twenty competitors, who left at two-minute intervals.

45 minutes into the event, the erstwhile stage leader was Jos van Emden with a time of 12' 46". An hour into the stage and with 36 riders having completed the course, van Emden still led the timesheets. Many of the cyclists in the early wave were out on the course on their usual road machine, with no aero bars to gain an aerodynamic advantage. Mark Cavendish – standing 62nd in the general classification – overtook the rider in front of him, sprinter Zico Waeytens, as he finished thirty seconds down on van Emden's time. Daniele Bennati then set the second-fastest time, seven seconds down on van Emden.

Shortly afterwards, Daniel Oss, wearing the polka dot jersey as he was second to Skujiņš in the mountains classification, set a time of 12' 59", which was the fourth-best time to that point. Overall classification favorite Sergio Henao completed the course in a time of 12' 57", with 's Robert Gesink a second slower. Van Emden had to wait until the penultimate rider Peter Sagan got on the course for his time to be beaten. Sagan negotiated the corners aggressively and registered a time of 12' 32", besting van Emden by fourteen seconds. With Skujiņš finishing 46 seconds behind in 34th position, Sagan moved into the race lead by 28 seconds.

Stage 7
May 16, 2015 — Ontario to Mount Baldy, 

The queen stage of the 2015 Tour of California, the riders contended with the first King of the Mountains climb, the second-category ascent of Glendora Ridge Road. After descending into Glendora for an intermediate sprint, the climbing resumed with another second-category climb, the Glendora Mountain Road, before an hors-category climb to the stage finish at Mount Baldy Ski Lifts.

The race start saw a flurry of attacks which were quickly brought back. On the climb to Glendora Ridge Road, a break tried to get clear including the first two riders in the mountains classification, Toms Skujiņš and Daniel Oss, who were separated by one point. Before the end of the climb, Skujiņš – who was second in the general classification – returned to the peloton; Lachlan Morton of  joined the break as Ratto and Norman Hansen were distanced. Oss took maximum points on the climb, with the peloton around two minutes behind at that point – of the breakaway riders, Oss was best placed in the general classification at 9' 29" behind race leader Peter Sagan.

The breakaway was splitting up on the twisting, narrow descent with Oss, Butler and Morton going clear for a period, but they were chased by the rest of the former breakaway group (with the exception of Butler), who made contact on the run-in to Glendora. Norman Hansen led the breakaway group through the intermediate sprint, prior to a mostly uphill section for  until the finish line. Van Zyl attacked and Oss, now in the lead of the mountains classification, made contact with him. With  to race, the gap from the peloton to the front of the race was two minutes and  upped the pace in an effort to drop Sagan. After Oss won maximum points at the Glendora Mountain Road climb, he dropped back to the peloton, leaving van Zyl on his own out front.

Skujiņš was distanced with  remaining, ensuring that he was fall down the order from second overall. 's Sergio Henao attacked, which caused Sagan to be dropped as he attempted to hold onto the race lead. Alaphilippe responded to Henao's attack, and ultimately dropped him on the snow-lined roads. He soloed through the twisting final kilometres featuring bad tarmac, and held on to take his first win of the season after numerous podium placings. Henao finished second, 23 seconds in arrears, alongside teammate Ian Boswell, while Sagan finished in sixth place some 47 seconds behind, meaning that Alaphilippe held a two-second lead in the general classification ahead of the final stage.

Stage 8
May 17, 2015 — L.A. Live to Pasadena, 

There was one intermediate sprint point at the first crossing of the finish line near the Rose Bowl, before the riders completed nine laps of a circuit in Pasadena.

This stage was supposed to have no consequences on the general classification due to its flat terrain, but the two-second difference separating Julian Alaphilippe and Peter Sagan meant that the Tour was not yet decided. A maximum of thirteen bonus seconds were on offer in the stage – the first three riders at both the intermediate sprint (3, 2 and 1 seconds) and the stage finish (10, 6 and 4 seconds) were able to gain time on the general classification.

A breakaway was formed, consisting of two  riders, Matteo Trentin and Yves Lampaert, Danny Pate, Jacques Janse van Rensburg and Ruben Zepuntke.  pulled at the front since they wanted to bring back the break so Sagan could have a chance to sprint for bonus seconds in the intermediate sprint. The team was down two riders since Maciej Bodnar and Michael Kolář had to abandon earlier in the race. Mark Cavendish stated that he would work for Alaphilippe and forget his own ambitions for a fourth stage victory.

 prior to the intermediate sprint, the breakaway was reeled in. Subsequent attacks came from several  riders but on each occasion were reabsorbed to the peloton. At the intermediate sprint, Cavendish won ahead of Sagan and Alaphilippe, meaning that Alaphilippe held a virtual lead of one second. Immediately after the sprint, two  riders went clear, Joseph Lewis and Oscar Clark. They were soon joined by 's Manuel Senni and Jesse Anthony.

Cavendish ultimately did take his fourth stage win of the race, ahead of Wouter Wippert. Third place went to a photo finish between Sagan and Tyler Farrar, with Sagan's bike throw on the line giving him the decision, the four-second resultant time bonus and the overall race victory by three seconds – the closest race-winning margin in its history – over Alaphilippe.

Classification leadership
In the 2015 Tour of California, five jerseys were awarded. For the general classification, calculated by adding the finishing times of the stages per cyclist, the leader received a yellow jersey sponsored by biopharmaceutical company Amgen, the title sponsor of the race as a whole. Time bonuses were awarded for the first three finishers on mass-start stages (10, 6 and 4 seconds respectively) and on intermediate sprints (3, 2 and 1 seconds respectively). This classification was considered the most important of the Tour of California, and the winner of the general classification was considered the winner of the Tour of California.

Additionally, there was also a sprints classification, akin to what is called the points classification in other races, which awarded a green and neon yellow jersey sponsored by nonprofit organization Visit California. In the sprints classification, cyclists received points for finishing in the top 15 in a stage. In addition, some points could be won in intermediate sprints as well as bonus seconds in the overall classification. The first across the line got 3 seconds, the second two and the third rider, one.

There was also a mountains classification, which awarded a white jersey with red polka dots, sponsored by automobile manufacturer Nissan. In the mountains classification, points were won by reaching the top of a mountain before other cyclists. Each climb was categorized, with more points available for the harder climbs. There was also a young rider classification, which was calculated the same way as the general classification, but only cyclists under the age of 23 were included. The leader of the young rider classification received a white and red jersey, sponsored by bicycle component manufacturer SRAM Corporation.

The last jersey was awarded to the most combative rider of a stage for him to wear on the next stage. It was generally awarded to a rider who attacked constantly or spent a lot of time in the breakaways. This jersey was white, blue and yellow, and was also sponsored by Amgen and their Breakaway from Cancer collaboration with four nonprofit organizations. There was also a classification for teams. In this classification, the times of the best three cyclists per stage were added, and the team with the lowest time was the leader.

Classification standings

General classification

Sprints classification

Young rider classification

Mountains classification

Teams classification

Notes

References

External links

 

Tour of California
Tour of California
Tour of California
Tour of California